Twyne's case (1601) 76 ER 809; 3 Co. Rep. 80b is a UK insolvency law case, concerning a fraudulent conveyance. Representative of earlier English law, it was considered that any transfer of property from a debtor to a creditor, after which the debtor remained in possession of that property, was a fraudulent act intended to defraud creditors. At the time, the law only recognised the mortgage and the pledge. A charge on property in possession of another was not allowed.

Facts
Pierce, a farmer, owed Twyne of Hampshire £400. He also owed another creditor £200, and this creditor brought an action. While the writ was pending, Pierce sold his sheep to Twyne to pay off his debt. However, Pierce remained in possession of the sheep, marking and shearing them. At the other creditor's instance, the Sheriff of Southampton came to collect the sheep. Twyne and his acquaintances resisted this. Twyne argued that he was a bona fide purchaser for valuable, and not inadequate, consideration within the Fraudulent Conveyances Act 1584 (27 Eliz c 4).

Judgment
The Star Chamber (Sir Thomas Egerton, Chief Justice Popham and Anderson) held this was an attempt to defraud his creditors under the Fraudulent Conveyances Act 1571 (13 Eliz c 5). The following reasons were given.

It was further held that the gift may have been on good consideration, but could not be bona fide.

See also

UK insolvency law
English property law
English land law

Notes

References

United Kingdom labour case law
1601 in law
1601 in England
Star Chamber cases